

Canadian Football News in 1896
In the MRFU, the fall session saw the Winnipeg Football Club (Winnipegs) and the St.John's Rugby Football Club (St.John's) compete. In the spring session of the season, the Royal Canadian Dragoons were added to the competition. The Winnipegs and the St.John's played a final league game to determine the regular season champion. The St.John's received a bye to the MRFU playoff finals while the Winnipegs played the Dragoons in the MRFU playoff semi-final.

Final regular season standings
Note: GP = Games Played, W = Wins, L = Losses, T = Ties, PF = Points For, PA = Points Against, Pts = Points

Bold text means that they have clinched the playoffs

League Champions

Playoffs

MRFU playoffs

ORFU semifinals

ORFU final

Dominion Championship

References

 
Canadian Football League seasons